King's Road (Finnish: Kuninkaantie, Swedish: Kungsvägen) is an old mailing route in Northern Europe dating back to the 14th century, starting from Bergen in Norway on the Atlantic coast, passing through the capitals of Norway and Sweden (Oslo and Stockholm) crossing the sea through the Åland archipelago to Turku in SW Finland and ending up in Vyborg in Russia.

The modern tourist route "King's Road" is extended to St. Petersburg.

See also 
 King's Road (disambiguation) for other King's Roads

External links
 

Roads in Finland
Old roads of Norway
Roads in Russia
Roads in Sweden